Karlheinz Klotz (born 10 March 1950, in Karlsruhe) was a West German athlete who competed mainly in the 100 metres.

He competed for West Germany in the 1972 Summer Olympics held in Munich, Germany in the 4 x 100 metre relay where he won the bronze medal with his team mates Jobst Hirscht, Gerhard Wucherer and Klaus Ehl.

References

Sports Reference

1950 births
West German male sprinters
Olympic bronze medalists for West Germany
Athletes (track and field) at the 1972 Summer Olympics
Olympic athletes of West Germany
Living people
Medalists at the 1972 Summer Olympics
Sportspeople from Karlsruhe
Olympic bronze medalists in athletics (track and field)